Iatrogenic calcinosis cutis is a cutaneous condition characterized by calcification of the skin resulting from the deposition of calcium and phosphorus introduced by a medical procedure, either inadvertently or as a specific therapy.

See also 
 Calcinosis cutis
 List of cutaneous conditions

References 

Skin conditions resulting from errors in metabolism